"The Last of the Famous International Playboys" is a song by British solo artist Morrissey. Co-written by Morrissey and former Smiths producer Stephen Street, the song was Morrissey's third release after the Smiths break-up. Morrissey was inspired lyrically by the East End gangster brothers the Kray Twins, whom he believed to be an example of the media glamourizing violent criminals. Street took influence from the Fall for the song's music, with the intro also resembling that of "The Man Who Sold the World" by David Bowie. The single was the first Morrissey solo single to feature his former Smiths bandmates Andy Rourke, Mike Joyce, and Craig Gannon.

"The Last of the Famous International Playboys" was recorded and released following Morrissey's debut album, Viva Hate. Upon release, the single became yet another commercial hit for Morrissey, reaching number six in the UK in spite of initially mixed reviews. The song would later appear on the 1990 compilation album, Bona Drag.

In the years since its release, "The Last of the Famous International Playboys" has become one of Morrissey's most remembered songs and remains critically acclaimed by modern writers.

Background
In a 1989 interview, Morrissey joked, The Last of the Famous International Playboys' are Bowie, Bolan, Devoto and me." Lyrically, however, "The Last of the Famous International Playboys" largely mythologizes the notorious pair of vicious London gangsters known as the Kray twins (Ronnie and Reggie Kray), who held a tight rein on the East End of London during the 1950s and  1960s. Morrissey has explained that he wanted to explore the way that the tabloid press made celebrities out of violent criminals in the song, saying that the Krays "exemplify" the "way notorious people can be quite glamorous." He elaborated in a separate interview,

"The Last of the Famous International Playboys" and follow-up single "Interesting Drug" are notable for featuring three of Morrissey's former colleagues in the Smiths—Andy Rourke, Mike Joyce and one-time Smiths rhythm guitarist Craig Gannon. For his previous solo work on the Viva Hate album, Morrissey consciously chose not to work with his former bandmates; Street commented, "I think he thought it would cloud the issue." All three sidemen also appear on the B-side, "Lucky Lisp".

As on Morrissey's previous solo songs, Street composed the music for "The Last of the Famous International Playboys". This included the song's bassline, in spite of the presence of Rourke. Street explained, "The songs I gave them to work on, 'Interesting Drug' and '...International Playboys' you know, they were my bass lines and such. I mean, Andy did his own version of it, but they were my bass lines. ... Andy is such a lovely guy, he would add to it, and he is such a great bass player." Street described the song "as a Fall type droning dirge," recalling, "Morrissey heard it and to my surprise said he'd like to use it. He came back a while later, suggested speeding it up, and presented 'Last of the Famous International Playboys'. I was stunned."

Release
Morrissey explained in a 1989 interview that he had high hopes for the single: The Last Of Famous International Playboys', is the first record that I feel hysterical about. And I'm very pleased to feel that way. I compare it to 'Shoplifters of the World Unite'. I heard 'Shoplifters of the World Unite' once on the radio, a chart rundown. It was a new entry. They had to play it. They had no choice. And I laughed hysterically as it listened to it. I felt a great sense of victory. And that's the same way I feel about 'The Last of the Famous International Playboys.

The single was another commercial success for Morrissey, with James Brown of the NME writing, in early 1989, "I have already heard serious suggestion that 'Last of the Famous Playboys' will be Morrissey's first number one hit record." It reached number 6 in the UK Singles Chart. The song was not featured on one of Morrissey's main studio albums but can be found on the compilation album Bona Drag along with the B-side "Lucky Lisp". The artwork for the single features Morrissey, aged six, up a tree in Chorlton-on-Medlock, Manchester—literally a boy at play. When asked if he had changed since the photo was taken, Morrissey commented, "Well, I have a new sweater."

Morrissey first performed the song live at his infamous debut solo concert at Wolverhampton's Civic Hall in December 1988, alongside Rourke, Joyce, and Gannon. That same month, the Guardian described the show as "primarily a showcase for Morrissey's New Year single, 'The Last of the Famous International Playboys. The song was performed live by Morrissey on his 1991, 1992, 2007, 2011 and 2018 tours.

Music video
The official video was directed by Tim Broad. It stars the actor Jason Rush, who had previously appeared in the 1987 television drama Two of Us, intercut with footage of the band performing against a green-screen backdrop. In the video, Rush is portrayed as the song's "dear hero imprisoned" in his metaphorical jail of a bedroom with walls decorated with posters of male icons such as Elvis Presley, Jack Nicholson, and George Best. The video later appeared on the compilation Hulmerist, which comprises seven videos made by Broad for Morrissey songs.

Critical reception
NME initially gave the single a negative review, with Stuart Maconie saying the track was Panic' without the magnetism and the blinding self-confidence" and concluding "I would still chain myself to a disused railway line in Bacup for him, but the lad can do better"—in a review for Bona Drag one year later, however, Maconie expressed a change of heart, writing, "At the time of its release, I was rather mealy-mouthed about 'Playboys' so let me take this chance of saying I was wrong about this sterling tune full of stomping boot boy romanticism." "The Last of the Famous International Playboys" has seen critical acclaim in the years since its release. In a retrospective review, Ned Raggett of AllMusic was much more favorable writing "Morrissey's performance is grand and passionate". PopMatters was similarly complimentary, writing, Such things I do / Just to make myself / More attractive to you / Have I failed? he asks. No, clearly, no again and again." Rolling Stone described it as a "great nonalbum single."

Other music writers have ranked the song as being among Morrissey's best. Spin named it Morrissey's seventh best solo song, writing, "Unusually wiggy guitar effects add to the unseemly drama." Clash included it in their unranked list of the seven best Morrissey solo singles, writing, "A love letter to London's notorious Kray twins, it's playful, hilarious and supremely confident. It rocks too, full of hip swinging swagger and glorious effervescence."

According to Johnny Rogan, Johnny Marr was so impressed with the quality of the song that he sent Morrissey a postcard congratulating him. Marr explained in a 1991 interview, "I did send him a note telling him that 'Last of the Famous International Playboys' was really good, a good 'un, something I knew he'd be proud of."

Track listings 
The etching on the British 7" and 12" reads, "ESCAPE FROM VALIUM/RETURN TO VALIUM."

7" vinyl 

 "The Last of the Famous International Playboys"
 "Lucky Lisp"

12" vinyl, compact disc and cassette 

 "The Last of the Famous International Playboys"
 "Lucky Lisp"
 "Michaels Bones"

Musicians 

 Morrissey - vocals
 Craig Gannon - guitar
 Neil Taylor - guitar
 Andy Rourke - bass
 Stephen Street - keyboards
 Mike Joyce - drums

Release details

Charts

2013 reissue 

The single was reissued along with a remastered version of his 1991 album Kill Uncle on 8 April 2013. The single was released in three versions, backed by new live Morrissey songs recorded in June 2011 by the BBC.

The 7-inch single included "People Are the Same Everywhere (BBC live version)" while the CD included "Action Is My Middle Name (BBC live version)". "The Kid's a Looker (BBC live version)" was available via digital download.

On 7 February 2013, it was stated on Morrissey's official website that the single would not feature the album artwork it was initially intended to feature. The cover art was to feature a previously unseen 1992 photo of Morrissey and David Bowie appearing together in New York City but Bowie had demanded that the photo not be used by EMI UK. Instead a photo of Morrissey and Rick Astley, taken backstage at Top of the Pops in 1989, was used in its place.

Cover versions 

The song was covered in 1994 by the Bent Backed Tulips, otherwise known as alt-pop band Dramarama. The version was acoustic, sung and played entirely by John Easdale, Dramarama's singer/songwriter. Its release was limited to a 7" vinyl single, and served as the B-side to "Tie Me Down".

Finnish band Russian Love made a cover version of the song on their fifth album, Gala Brutale, released by Zen Garden in 1996.

Pop punk band J Church covered the song on their album Nostalgic for Nothing.

Thrash band Leeway covered the song on The World Still Won't Listen, a compilation of hardcore and punk bands covering The Smiths and Morrissey songs.

The song is covered by Austin, Texas rock band Gentlemen Rogues on its 2018 EP Fatal Music.

References 

Morrissey songs
1989 singles
1989 songs
Works about the Kray twins
Songs written by Morrissey
Songs written by Stephen Street